François-Maurice Allotte de La Fuÿe (6 November 1844, La Rochelle – 13 February 1939, Versailles) was a French military officer, archaeologist and numismatist.

From 1863 to 1865 he was a student at the École Polytechnique in Paris and afterwards was associated with the École impériale d’application de l’artillerie et du génie (Imperial school of artillery application and engineering) in Metz. In 1886/87 he was in charge of construction of the military barracks at Tébessa, Algeria. Several years later, he was appointed commandant of the School of Engineering in Grenoble. From 1897 to 1904 he was a member of the French archaeological delegation in Persia (Susa).

From 1914 to 1936 he was a correspondent member of the Académie des Inscriptions et Belles-Lettres. In 1933 he was named president of the Société française de numismatique.

Publications 
 Les mosaïques de Tébessa. Mosaïque de l'Oued–Athmenia, 1888
 Le Trésor de Sainte–Blandine, 1891
 Mémoire sur l'emploi des appareils photographiques pour les observations à grande et à petite distance, 1892 (Lire en ligne)
 La dynastie des Kamnaskirès, 1902 
 Nouveau classement des monnaies arsacides d'après le catalogue du British Museum, 1904
 Monnaies arsacides surfrappées, 1904
 Monnaies de l'Élymäide, 1904
 Monnaies de l'Élymaïde, 1905
 Monnaies arsacides de la collection Petrowicz, 1905
 Numismatique de la Perside, 1906
 Étude sur la numismatique de la Perside, 1906
 Un document de comptabilité de l'époque d'Ouroukagina, roi de Lagach, 1906
 Les sceaux de Lougalanda, patési de Lagash (Sirpourla) et de sa femme Barnamtarra, 1907
 Observations sur la numismatique de la Perside, 1907
 Documents présargoniques, 1908-1920
 En-Gil-Sa, patési de Lagaš, 1909
 Mesures de capacité dans les textes archaïques de Telloh, 1909
 Le gour saggal et ses subdivisions : d'après les documents présargoniques de Lagǎs, 1909
 En-e-tar-zi patési de Lagaš, 1909
 Les monnaies incertaines de la Sogdiane et des contrées voisines, 1910
 Correspondance sumérologique, 1913
 Une Monnaie incertaine au nom d'Artavasde, 1914
 Le mystère de talismans musulmans, 1915
 Un dirham talismanique musulman, 1915
 Un cadastre de Djokha, 1915
 Un cadastre de Djokha, 1915
 Mesures agraires et formules d'arpentage à l'époque présargonique, 1915
 Les monnaies de l’Élymaïde. Modifications au classement proposé en 1907, 1919
 Compte de gestion d'un Entrepôt de Matériaux à Tummaal, 1919
 L'iconographie de Moïse sur quelques médailles modernes à légendes hébraïques, 1919
 Le sceau d'Ur-é-innanna sur un tronc de cône étiquette : étude comparative des sceaux de cette époque, 1920
 Les Us-Ku dans les textes archaïques de Lagas, 1921
 Alphabet araméen-sogdien ?, 1921
 La coupe magique de Hit sur l'Euphrate décorée d'écritures manichéennes et d'exorcismes surprenants, 1924
 Une coupe magique en écriture manichéenne, 1924
 Jacques de Morgan, 1924
 Fragments de vase avec inscription provenant de Téhéran, 1925
 Monnaie inédite de Xerxès roi d'Arsamosate provenant des fouilles de Suse, 1927
 Imitations de la drachme de Varahran V frappée à Merv, 1927
 Une monnaie musulmane d'un type inédit trouvée à Suse, 1928
 Mission en Susiane, 1928
 Numismatique t.XX, Mission archéologique de Perse, 1928
 Deux inscriptions inédites d'Oumma relatives à la navigation : Le sens du mot KAR dans les comptes-rendus de Larsa, 1928
 Le pentagramme pythagoricien. Sa diffusion, son emploi dans la syllabaire cunéiforme, 1934
 Archéologie, métrologie et numismatique susiennes, 1934
 Le pentagramme pythagoricien : Sa diffusion, son emploi dans le syllabaire cunéiforme, 1934
 Inventaire des monnaies trouvées à Suse, Mission archéologique de Perse, campagnes de fouilles 1925,1926,1927, 1928, t. XX et t. XXV, 1935

References 

1844 births
1939 deaths
People from La Rochelle
École Polytechnique alumni
École pratique des hautes études alumni
French numismatists
French archaeologists
French collectors
Commandeurs of the Légion d'honneur
French colonels